Kenneth Ambrose Walsh (November 24, 1916 – July 30, 1998) was a United States Marine Corps lieutenant colonel and a Medal of Honor recipient who was the fourth ranking USMC fighter ace in World War II with a record of 21 enemy planes destroyed. He also served in Korea during the first year of the Korean War and retired from the Marine Corps in February 1962.

Early life
Walsh was born in Brooklyn, New York. He graduated from Dickinson High School in Jersey City, New Jersey, in 1933.

Military career
Walsh enlisted in the Marine Corps on 15 December 1933, at age 17. Following recruit training at Marine Corps Recruit Depot Parris Island, South Carolina, he became an aircraft mechanic and radioman at Marine Corps Base Quantico, Virginia. In March 1936, he was transferred, and entered flight training at NAS in Pensacola, Florida. He was still a private when he received his Wings of Gold as a U.S. Naval Aviator on 26 April 1937, but was promoted to corporal soon thereafter. He flew scout-observation aircraft over the next four years on three aircraft carriers, before assignment to VMF-121 in North Carolina.

At the time of the attack on Pearl Harbor, he was a master technical sergeant, becoming a Marine Gunner (equivalent to warrant officer) on 11 May 1942, while serving with Marine Aircraft Group 12, 1st Marine Aircraft Wing. He was commissioned a second lieutenant the following October and was promoted to first lieutenant in June 1943. He was also one of a handful of Marine aviators qualified as an aircraft carrier landing signal officer. Assigned to VMF-124 since September 1942, Walsh was one of the most experienced pilots in the Corps' first Vought F4U Corsair squadron. The unit had arrived at Guadalcanal in February 1943, and was immediately committed to combat. He claimed his first three Japanese planes on 1 April 1943 and two more in his next combat action, 13 May 1943, becoming the first Corsair fighter ace. Walsh brought his score to 20 victories by the end of August 1943, including two combat actions over the Solomon Islands which earned him the Medal of Honor. He returned to the United States on 15 October 1943.

President Franklin D. Roosevelt presented Walsh the Medal of Honor on 8 February 1944; he was promoted to temporary captain effective 8 February when he received the award and was promoted to permanent captain on 13 November 1948.

Walsh returned to flying combat missions in April 1945, serving with VMF-122, and was awarded his 7th Distinguished Flying Cross for heroism and extraordinary achievement from 28 April to 12 May 1945, in the Philippine Islands area. He scored his last kill while serving as the Operations Officer of VMF-222 at Okinawa on 22 June 1945. He became the Assistant Operations Officer of Marine Aircraft Group 14, 2nd Marine Aircraft Wing on Okinawa. He returned to the United States in March 1946.

Walsh served in Korea during the Korean War with VMR-152 (Marine Transport Squadron 152), flying C-54 transports, from 15 July 1950 to late July 1951. He was promoted to major in April 1955 and lieutenant colonel in October 1958.

Retirement and later life
In 1955 Walsh moved his family to the West Floral Park neighborhood of Santa Ana. Walsh retired from the Marine Corps as a lieutenant colonel on 1 February 1962. He was a frequent participant in history seminars and often assisted researchers and historians interested in the Pacific War.

Walsh died at age 81 due to a heart attack. He left a widow, Beulah, and a son, and was buried at Arlington National Cemetery on 13 August 1998.

Military awards
Walsh's military decorations and awards include:

Medal of Honor citation
Rank and organization: First Lieutenant, pilot in Marine Fighting Squadron 124, U.S. Marine Corps.
Place and date: Solomon Islands area, 15 and 30 August 1943.
Entered service at: New York.
Born: 24 November 1916, Brooklyn, N.Y.
Other Navy awards: Distinguished Flying Cross with 5 Gold Stars

Citation:

See also
List of Medal of Honor recipients for World War II

Notes

References
Barrett Tillman (1979).  Corsair: The F4U in World War II and Korea.  Naval Institute Press, Annapolis
Frank Olynyk (1995).  Stars & Bars: A Tribute to the American Fighter Ace 1920–1973.  Grub Street, London

Further reading
  NB: Includes profile of Kenneth Walsh.

External links
Arlington National Cemetery

Mersky, Commander Peter B. Time of the Aces: Marine Pilots in the Solomons, Marines in World War II Commemorative Series, Marine Corps History and Museums Division, United States Marine Corps, 1993. (Retrieved on 2006-07-15)

1916 births
1998 deaths
American World War II flying aces
Aviators from New York (state)
Burials at Arlington National Cemetery
People from Jersey City, New Jersey
Recipients of the Distinguished Flying Cross (United States)
United States Marine Corps Medal of Honor recipients
United States Marine Corps colonels
United States Marine Corps pilots of World War II
United States Naval Aviators
William L. Dickinson High School alumni
World War II recipients of the Medal of Honor
United States Marine Corps personnel of the Korean War
Recipients of the Air Medal
Military personnel from New Jersey